COGASM is a side project of singer Robert Smith of The Cure, drummer Jason Cooper and guitarist Reeves Gabrels. The first two letters of the members' surnames were taken to form the group's name, which is properly spelled with all capital letters. The band was put together for the one-time purpose of creating a song for the soundtrack to the movie Orgazmo.

Discography 
The single, "A Sign From God," appeared on the Orgazmo soundtrack, 1998. The song "Wrong Number" was recorded in the same session by the same formation, but instead credited to "The Cure" and released on the band's greatest hits Galore.

References

The Cure